The Bostrichidae are a family of beetles with more than 700 described species. They are commonly called auger beetles, false powderpost beetles, or horned powderpost beetles. The head of most auger beetles cannot be seen from above, as it is downwardly directed and hidden by the thorax. Exceptions are the powderpost beetles (subfamily Lyctinae), and members of the subfamily Psoinae.

Bostrychoplites cornutus has large, distinctive thoracic horns, and is found in parts of Africa and Arabia; it is often imported to Europe as larvae in African wooden bowls ("ethnic souvenirs") .

The fossil record of the family extends to the Cretaceous, with the oldest records being from the Cenomanian aged Charentese and Burmese ambers,  belonging to the extant genus Stephanopachys and the extant subfamilies Dinoderinae and Polycaoninae.

Selected species
This list is incomplete:

 Amphicerus cornutus (Pallas, 1772)
 Apate terebrans (Pallas, 1772)
 Prostephanus truncatus (Horn, 1878)

Species found in Australia
 Dinoderus minutus (Fabricius)
 Lyctus brunneus (Stephens)
 Lyctus discedens Blackburn
 Lyctus parallelocollis Blackburn
 Mesoxylion collaris (Erichson)
 Mesoxylion cylindricus (Macleay)
 Minthea rugicollis (Walker)
 Rhyzopertha dominica (Fabricius) - lesser grain borer
 Sinoxylon anale (Lesne)
 Xylion cylindricus Macleay
 Xylobosca bispinosa (Macleay)
 Xylodeleis obsipa Germar
 Xylopsocus gibbicollis (Macleay)
 Xylothrips religiosus (Boisduval)
 Xylotillus lindi (Blackburn)

Species found in the United Kingdom
 Bostrichus capucinus
 Bostrychoplites cornutus (Olivier, 1790)
 Stephanopachys substriatus
 Trogoxylon parallelopipedum
 Lyctus cavicollis
 Lyctus linearis (Goeze, 1877)
 Lyctus planicollis
 Lyctus sinensis

Fossil species
Discoclavata dominicana†Poinar Jr, 2013

References

Bibliography

External links
Lucid Fact Sheet
 Heterobostrychus aequalis, an oriental wood borer on the UF / IFAS Featured Creatures Web site
  Lyctus planicollis, southern lyctus beetle on the UF / IFAS Featured Creatures Web site
  Xylopsocus capucinus, a false powderpost beetle on the UF / IFAS Featured Creatures Web site

 
Beetle families